Fahad Al-Shammari (Arabic: فهد الشمري; born May 5, 1981 in Riyadh) is a Saudi Arabian footballer who plays as a goalkeeper .

He was a reserve goalkeeper for Al Hilal in the 2009 AFC Champions League group stages.

References

1981 births
Living people
People from Ha'il
Association football goalkeepers
Saudi Arabian footballers
Al Hilal SFC players
Al-Raed FC players
Al-Tai FC players
Al-Qadsiah FC players
Al-Ahli Saudi FC players
Al-Taawoun FC players
Al-Fayha FC players
Saudi Professional League players